Fire Birds (released under the alternative title Wings of the Apache) is a 1990 American military action film directed by David Green and produced by William Badalato, Keith Barish and Arnold Kopelson. The storyline was conceived by retired Lt. Colonels Step Tyner and John K. Swensson and retired Marine Capt. Dale Dye and developed into a screenplay written by Paul F. Edwards, Nick Thiel and uncredited David Taylor. The film stars Nicolas Cage, Tommy Lee Jones and Sean Young. Cage is cast as a helicopter pilot attempting to help dismantle a drug cartel in South America. Jones plays his pilot instructor and senior ranked military officer during his flight training, while Young portrays his love interest.

Production of the film was a co-production between the Walt Disney Studios and Nova International Films. It was commercially released under Disney's Touchstone Pictures label. The movie featured elaborate aerial stunt sequences, involving combat helicopters.

Fire Birds premiered in theaters nationwide in the United States on May 25, 1990 grossing a modest $14,760,451 in domestic ticket receipts. The film was met with negative critical reviews before its initial screening in cinemas; generally due to its melancholy dialogue and striking plot similarities to the more popular 1986 action film Top Gun, starring Tom Cruise and Kelly McGillis.

Plot
A joint task force operation between the Drug Enforcement Administration (DEA) and the U.S. Army has been formed to dismantle one of the largest drug cartels operating in South America. Multiple attempts to assault the cartel's mountainous compound have been thwarted by a (fictional) Scorpion-attack helicopter (based on MD500 helicopter) piloted by a mercenary pilot, Eric Stoller (Bert Rhine). After having several aircraft shot down, most notably a pair of UH–60 Black Hawks and their AH–1 Cobra escorts, the army turns to the new AH–64 Apache attack helicopter, which can match its enemies' maneuverability and firepower.

Pilot Jake Preston (Nicolas Cage) is subsequently enlisted in the Apache air-to-air combat training program. Earlier, Preston was the sole survivor of a previous air-attack by Stoller. Upon his arrival at the training course, he encounters his ex-girlfriend Billie Lee Guthrie (Sean Young), who broke off their relationship to pursue a separate career flying OH–58 Kiowa scout helicopters which often work alongside the Apache as target identifiers and designators. Jake's arrogance and loose improvised style quickly earn him the mixed respect and chagrin of veteran pilot and flight instructor Brad Little (Tommy Lee Jones). During the training schedule, Preston is revealed to be suffering from an eye dominance disability, which makes it difficult for him to utilize the Apache's visual input. Using an unconventional but effective training method, Little helps Preston deal with his handicap.

A formation of military aircraft consisting of four Apaches and Guthrie's Kiowa, flies down to South America to provide air support for a DEA mission to hunt down and arrest drug cartel leaders. However, they are soon attacked at their base camp, and one Apache is destroyed. With another Apache left to protect the DEA personnel, Preston, Little and Guthrie attempt to seek out Stoller. They soon locate his position, as well as a pair of Draken jet fighter aircraft who are also protecting the cartel. Little destroys one aircraft, but is shot down in aerial combat by Stoller. He survives, but his Apache is disabled. Stoller later targets Guthrie, but Preston reaches their coordinates and engages him in a fierce dogfight. Using the Apache's manoeuvrability near a mountainous peak, Preston manages to trick Stoller into flying past him; then attacks and destroys his helicopter. Meanwhile, Guthrie uses one of the Stinger missiles onboard Little's downed Apache to destroy the remaining enemy aircraft. With no air support, the cartel's defenses cease, and their leaders are later apprehended. As an injured Little is loaded onto a Medevac helicopter, he expresses pride in both Preston and Guthrie.

Cast

Production

Filming
Filming for Fire Birds was shot primarily on location in Tucson Arizona at Pima Community College as well as at Fort Hood, Texas army installation, home of the Army's Apache Training Brigade (21st Cavalry Brigade (AIR COMBAT)) .<ref>Green, David (Director). Fire Birds [Motion picture]. Hollywood, California: Touchstone Pictures,  1990.</ref> Extensive aerial stunt sequences were coordinated with the National Guard of the United States, the United States Army and the United States Air Force. Between technical advisers, stuntmen, and pilots, over 100 personnel were directly involved in the production aspects of the film. AH-64 Apache, UH-60 Blackhawk, AH-1 Cobra, MD Helicopters MD 500 and OH-58 Kiowa rotorcraft, as well as Saab 35 Draken aircraft were employed during filming. Technical assistance from McDonnell Douglas service representatives was also utilized during production. The helicopter training aerial stunt sequences were designed by Richard T. Stevens who also coordinated visuals for the film, Top Gun. Scenes from the movie, also features as static shots from MicroProse Gunship 2000 computer game.

Music
The original motion picture soundtrack for Fire Birds, composed and conducted by David Newman, was not officially released to the public when the movie was released, however Intrada has released a special collection of the soundtrack.

Release
Home media
Following its cinematic release in theaters, the film was released in VHS video format on September 26, 1990. The Region 1 Code widescreen edition of the film was released on DVD in the United States on February 3, 2004. Special features for the DVD include, a closed captioned French language track, Dolby Digital Surround Sound, and a Widescreen (1.85:1) enhanced feature for 16x9 televisions. The film was released on Blu-ray by Mill Creek Entertainment on July 7, 2015 and by Kino Lorber on Jul 10, 2018. While the Mill Creek release had no special features, the Kino Lorber release includes an audio commentary by the film's director David Green and a theatrical trailer.

Reception
Box officeFire Birds premiered in cinemas on May 25, 1990 in wide release throughout the U.S. During its opening weekend, the film opened in a distant 5th place and grossed $6,358,761 in business showing at 2,006 theaters. The film Back to the Future Part III opened in first place with $23,703,060. The film's revenue dropped by 58.9% in its second week of release, earning $2,611,812. For that particular weekend, the film fell one spot to 6th place still showing in 2,006 theaters. The film Total Recall, unseated Back to the Future Part III to open in first place."The Top Movies, Weekend of June 1, 1990." The Numbers. Retrieved: July 18, 2015. For its final weekend in release, the film opened in 8th place showing at 1,539 theaters grossing $1,246,590 in box office business. The film went on to top out domestically at $14,760,451 in total ticket sales through a 3-week theatrical run. For 1990 as a whole, the film would cumulatively rank at a box office performance position of 83.

Critical response
Among critics in the U.S., the film received mostly negative reviews. Rotten Tomatoes reported that 9% of 22 sampled critics gave the film a positive review, with an average score of 3.1 out of 10. The consensus summarizes: "Despite the talent on board, Fire Birds is little more than a subpar military adventure sporting video game-like action, outdated philosophy, and uneven acting."

Hal Hinson, writing in The Washington Post said, "Fire Birds is a primitive dogfight movie, with Nicolas Cage and Sean Young as its stars, that serves as a kind of extended commercial for the U.S. Army and its AH-64 Gunship helicopter". He bluntly noted that "it would be hard to reduce filmmaking to its basics more than Fire Birds does. It's more video game than motion picture – the first coin-operated movie." Roger Ebert in the Chicago Sun-Times offered a negative review; commenting: "It was tempting to say that I might have liked this movie more if I'd never seen Top Gun; but the fact is, if Top Gun had never been made, Fire Birds would still have seemed like a completely ordinary movie." He continued, "the aerial sequences in Top Gun are so superior to the confusing helicopter battles in this film, there's no contest there". He concluded: "I was really left unmoved by it." In the Deseret News, critic Chris Hicks wrote that the film's "predictability isn't the worst of Fire Birds'  problems. The dialogue is so hokey you'll have a hard time not laughing out loud. Did I say dialogue? Make that pontificating soundbites." He further expanded on his viewpoint saying, "the most obnoxious aspect of Fire Birds, however, is how everybody tells Cage's character how wonderful he is at every opportunity — including Cage himself, who has a big scene in a chopper simulator where he screams  "I am the greatest!"  after every target he hits."

Vincent Canby writing in The New York Times saw the film as having "many laughs, all of them unintentional" while pointing out that actor Cage "plays the sort of B-picture role that might once have suited William Gargan. Unlike Mr. Gargan, though, Mr. Cage insists on acting. Mr. Cage simply won't quit. He never listens to or sees anybody else in a scene, being too busy monitoring his own utterly mysterious, attention-getting responses." He did though compliment Jones and Young on their performances saying, "Mr. Jones and Miss Young are somewhat better. He has a secure, cool manner that registers well on the screen, and she can seem to be intelligent". The Variety Staff, felt Fire Birds had a "tongue-in-cheek aspect" and that "Camaraderie and rat-a-tat-tat dialog may have started out as fun a la Howard Hawks' classic Only Angels Have Wings but emerges at times as a satire of the genre." On Jones's performance, they noticed how he was "dead-on as the taskmaster instructor who cornily singles out Cage for rough treatment". Film critic Gene Siskel of the Chicago Tribune gave the film a thumbs down review gruffly saying, "this movie had nothing to do with the drug wars at all" and that "they could have been having a competition for the olympics". In reference to the drug wars, he openly wondered–why couldn't the movie have been "written at that hard level?" Similarly, Owen Gleiberman writing for Entertainment Weekly viewed Fire Birds as "a third-rate knockoff of Top Gun and Blue Thunder". Not impressed with the overall acting, he noted how Cage gave "a dull, one-note performance." He did however, reserve praise for the stunts and visuals in the film saying, "the climactic air battle is well staged, though without the edge-of-the-envelope dread that made the Top Gun dogfights genuinely thrilling." But in summing up his overall negativity for the movie, he expressed his dissatisfaction by lamenting, "the film practically pats itself on the back for featuring villains that have been in the news recently. Yet, with the exception of one anonymous enemy pilot, we never even get to see the bad guys. And so it's hard to work up much enthusiasm for their destruction." Film critic Leonard Maltin's review was similar: "...Standard military issue with a ruptured-duck script and a complete lack of romantic chemistry between professional rivals Cage and Young. Jones doesn't exactly evoke memories of Gregory Peck in Twelve O'Clock High when he pep-talks Cage into a 'full-tilt boogie for freedom and justice'."

References
Notes

Bibliography

 Maltin, Leonard. Leonard Maltin's Movie Guide 2009. New York: New American Library, 2009 (originally published as TV Movies, then Leonard Maltin’s Movie & Video Guide''), First edition 1969, published annually since 1988. .

External links

 
 
 
 Fire Birds at the Movie Review Query Engine
 
 

1990 films
1990 action films
American action films
American aviation films
Films about the United States Army
Films about drugs
Films set in South America
Films shot in Tucson, Arizona
Touchstone Pictures films
American women aviators
Films scored by David Newman
1990s English-language films
1990s American films